Surfer's ear is the common name for an exostosis or abnormal bone growth within the ear canal. Surfer's ear is not the same as swimmer's ear, although infection can result as a side effect.

Irritation from cold wind and water exposure causes the bone surrounding the ear canal to develop lumps of new bony growth which constrict the ear canal. Where the ear canal is actually blocked by this condition, water and wax can become trapped and give rise to infection. The condition is so named due to its prevalence among cold water surfers. Warm water surfers are also at risk for exostosis due to the evaporative cooling caused by wind and the presence of water in the ear canal.

Most avid surfers have at least some mild bone growths (exostoses), causing little to no problems. The condition is progressive, making it important to take preventive measures early, preferably whenever surfing.  
The condition is not limited to surfing and can occur in any activity with cold, wet, windy conditions such as windsurfing, kayaking, sailing, jet skiing, kitesurfing, and diving.

Signs and symptoms
In general, one ear will be somewhat worse than the other due to the prevailing wind direction of the area surfed or the side that most often strikes the wave first.

Decreased hearing or hearing loss, temporary or ongoing
Increased prevalence of ear infections, causing ear pain
Difficulty evacuating debris or water from the ear causing a plugging sensation

Cause
The majority of patients present in their mid-30s to late 40s. This is likely due to a combination of the slow growth of the bone and the decreased participation in activities associated with surfer's ear past the 30s. However, surfer's ear is possible at any age and is directly proportional to the amount of time spent in cold, wet, windy weather without adequate protection.

The normal ear canal is approximately 7 mm in diameter and has a volume of approximately 0.8 ml (approximately one-sixth of a teaspoon). As the condition progresses, the diameter narrows and can even close completely if untreated, although people generally seek help once the passage has constricted to 0.5–2 mm due to the noticeable hearing impairment. While not necessarily harmful in and of itself, constriction of the ear canal from these growths can trap debris, leading to painful and difficult to treat infections.

Prevention
The widespread use of wetsuits has allowed people to surf in much colder waters, which has increased the incidence and severity of surfer's ear for people who do not properly protect their ears.

Avoid activity during extremely cold or windy conditions.
Keep the ear canal as warm and dry as possible.
Ear plugs
Wetsuit hood
Swim cap
Diving helmet

Treatment

Surgery to remove the obstructing ear canal bone is usually performed under general anesthesia in an operating room and aided by the use of a binocular microscope.  Most ear surgeons use a drill to remove the bone and may approach the area directly via the ear canal or by making an incision behind the ear and dissecting the ear forward. In using a drilling technique, it is important to keep the thin inner ear canal skin away from the drill to preserve the skin and allow optimal skin coverage at the conclusion of the surgery.

Some doctors now prefer to use 1 millimeter chisels to remove the obstructing bone and enter directly through the ear canal.  This technique enhances skin preservation. This technique may, in some cases, be performed under sedation with local anesthesia.

During recuperation from surgery, it is extremely important not to expose the ear canal to water to minimize the chance of infection or complications.

Depending on the condition of the ear canal and the surgical technique used, the ear canal may require several weeks to several months to heal.

Unprotected exposure of ear canals to cold water and wind after treatment can lead to regrowth of bone and the need for repeated operations on the same ear.

See also

References

External links

Inflammations
Surfing
Diseases of the ear and mastoid process
Sports medicine
Surf culture